IntEnz (Integrated relational Enzyme database) contains data on enzymes organized by enzyme EC number and is the official version of the Enzyme Nomenclature system developed by the International Union of Biochemistry and Molecular Biology.

References

External links 
  

Enzyme databases
Science and technology in Cambridgeshire
South Cambridgeshire District